Hunchun (Chosŏn'gŭl: 혼춘; Hangul: 훈춘) is a county-level city in the Yanbian Korean Autonomous Prefecture, far eastern Jilin province. It borders North Korea (North Hamgyong province) and Russia (Primorsky Krai), has over 250,000 inhabitants, and covers 5,145 square kilometers. The site of the eastern capital of Balhae/Bohai Kingdom between 785 and 793, Donggyeong, was located here.

The city's name Hunchun comes from Huncun in Manchu language..

The city and the village Fangchuan is located near the point of junction of the borders of China, Russia, and North Korea; provided with an observation platform, it is a popular tourist attraction.

Administrative divisions

Hunchun has four subdistricts, four towns, and five townships.

Subdistricts:
Xin'an Subdistrict ( / ), Jinghe Subdistrict ( / ), Henan Subdistrict ( / ), Jinhai Subdistrict ( / )

Towns:
Chunhua ( / ), Jingxin ( / ), Banshi ( / ), Ying'an ( / )

Townships:
Hadamen Township ( / ), Machuanzi Township ( / ), Mihong Township ( / ), Sanjiazi Manchu Ethnic Township ( / ), Yangbaozi Manchu Ethnic Township ( / )

Climate

Economy
Since the early 1990s, the Chinese government invested a lot in transforming Hunchun into a regional economic center, thanks in large part to the influence of the former Jilin governor Wang Zhongyu, whose work with Zhu Rongji allowed him to become the first head of China's State Economic and Trade Commission. On 9 March 1992 the Chinese parliament approved to set up Hunchun Border Economic Cooperation Zone. The national government and Jilin provincial government have invested in succession over four billion yuan in Hunchun through the 1990s.

On 16 March 2013, a joint agreement to export textiles to North Korea was announced. The textiles would be made into up to 8,000 shirts in North Korea and exported back to China.

In 2002 and 2001, Hunchun Export Processing Zone and Hunchun Sino-Russia Trade Zone was set up in it. Being located in the junction of China, Russia, and Korea, it enjoys a strategic location. The city focuses on the development of sea food processing, electronic product manufacture, bio-pharmacy, textile industry and other industries.

Hunchun Export Processing Zone is located in  area in Hunchun Border Economic Cooperation Zone. It enjoys good infrastructure and policies as its parent zone does.

Transport
In the early 1990s, Jilin province government constructed a railway and improved the highway to Hunchun. The Tumen River Bridge connects between Hunchun and the North Korean village of Wonjeong in Sonbong County. The bridge was built during the Japanese occupation in 1938. In 2010 the bridge was renovated as part of an agreement between North Korea and China to modernize the Rason port in North Korea. In addition, a new railway line was constructed which links Hunchun and Makhalino (a station on the Ussuriysk-Khasan line,  before Khasan) in Russia and began operating in February 2000.

The Jilin–Hunchun intercity railway, a 250-km/h high-speed passenger rail line from Jilin to Hunchun via Tumen, began construction work in January 2011, and was scheduled and finished at the end of September 2015. The railway has been described as "Dongbei's most beautiful railway" (due to the terrain it runs through) and "the fastest way to Vladivostok" (4 hours by train from Shenyang to Hunchun, plus four hours by bus from Hunchun to Vladivostok). Reflecting the border location of the city, the train station has its sign in four languages: Chinese, Korean, Russian, and English.

Sister Cites
 Rason, North Korea

References

 
Cities in Yanbian
County-level divisions of Jilin
National Forest Cities in China
China–North Korea border crossings
China–Russia border crossings